This is a list of notable oil and gas companies of Bangladesh.

B

 Bangladesh Petroleum Corporation
 Bashundhara Oil & Gas Company Limited

G

 Gas Transmission Company Limited

J

 Jamuna Oil Company

M 

 Meghna Petroleum Limited

P

 Padma Oil Company
 Petrobangla

T

 Titas Gas

 
Bangladesh
Oil